Federalist No. 77 is an essay by Alexander Hamilton, the seventy-seventh of The Federalist Papers. It was published on April 2, 1788, under the pseudonym Publius, the name under which all The Federalist papers were published. The title is "The Appointing Power Continued and Other Powers of the Executive Considered", and it is the last in a series of 11 essays discussing the powers and limitations of the Executive Branch.

In this paper, Hamilton discusses the power of the Senate to approve a President's appointments, the Executive's ability to call Congress together to give the State of the Union, and shares his concluding thoughts on the President's powers discussed throughout all of the Federalist Papers’ previous commentary.

Summary 
Hamilton opens by acknowledging the counterarguments that oppose the "Union of the Senate with the President," established by both branches of government playing a role in the nomination process. He writes that some say it would result in the President having "undue influence" over the Senate and that others say it would have the opposite tendency. In response, Hamilton argues that the idea that this provision would create presidential power over the Senate when the concept of a confirmation process is actually restraining executive power is "an absurdity in terms." To argue against the idea that requiring Senate confirmation is problematic because it will give the Senate influence over the President, he argues that the power of influence equates "conferring a benefit" and since the "power of nomination is unequivocally vested in the Executive" and the Senate can only "obstruct their course," the Senate cannot confer a benefit from the Executive. Thus, Hamilton reasons that the Senate does not have influence over the President. 

When advocating for the nomination process outlined in the Constitution, Hamilton argues that having a Senate confirmation process would turn presidential appointments into "matters of notoriety" and that the public "would be at no loss" to form opinions on the nominees compared to the traditional "shut up" small group that appointed positions at the State level during his time. By doing this, Hamilton chose to criticize his own state of New York's method and makes the point of how a public, large scale process would increase accountability for both the President and the Senate compared to the current norm. He also adds that it is far easier to manipulate a small group than a big group like the Senate. Again, he juxtaposes what is outlined in the Constitution with New York's appointment process at the time, which was that 3-5 men, including the governor, would make these decisions behind closed doors.

Hamilton moves on from discussion of Senate confirmations to defend the Executive's constitutional power to give information to Congress on the State of the Union. He acknowledges that those who criticize the extent of this power only question the President's ability to convene each branch separately. Hamilton argues that since the Executive branch has "concurrent power" with the Senate, and only the Senate, to form treaties that it would be "unnecessary and improper" to convene the House of Representatives as well.

References

Further reading
Jeremy D. Bailey, The Traditional View of Hamilton’s Federalist No. 77 and an Unexpected Challenge, 33 Harvard J.L. & Pub. Policy 169 (2010). 
The Puzzle of Hamilton's Federalist No. 77, 33 Harvard J.L. & Pub. Pol'y 149 (2010). 
Dietze, Gottfried. The Federalist: A Classic on Federalism and Free Government, Baltimore: The Johns Hopkins Press, 1960.
Epstein, David F. The Political Theory of the Federalist, Chicago: The University of Chicago Press, 1984.
Gray, Leslie, and Wynell Burroughs. "Teaching With Documents: Ratification of the Constitution," Social Education, 51 (1987): 322–324.
Kesler, Charles R. Saving the Revolution: The Federalist Papers and the American Founding, New York: 1987.
Patrick, John J., and Clair W. Keller. Lessons on the Federalist Papers: Supplements to High School Courses in American History, Government and Civics, Bloomington, IN: Organization of American Historians in association with ERIC/ChESS, 1987. ED 280 764.
Schechter, Stephen L. Teaching about American Federal Democracy, Philadelphia: Center for the Study of Federalism at Temple University, 1984. ED 248 161.
Sunstein, Cass R. The Enlarged Republic—Then and Now, New York Review of Books, (March 26, 2009): Volume LVI, Number 5, 45. http://www.nybooks.com/articles/22453
Webster, Mary E. The Federalist Papers: In Modern Language Indexed for Today's Political Issues. Bellevue, WA.: Merril Press, 1999.
White, Morton. Philosophy, The Federalist, and the Constitution, New York: 1987.
Yarbrough, Jean. "The Federalist". This Constitution: A Bicentennial Chronicle, 16 (1987): 4–9. SO 018 489
Zebra Edition. The Federalist Papers: (Or, How Government is Supposed to Work), Edited for Readability. Oakesdale, WA: Lucky Zebra Press, 2007.

External links 

 Text of The Federalist No. 77: congress.gov
 Federalist No. 77 Text

77
1788 in American law
1788 essays
1788 in the United States